Elattoneura cellularis is a species of damselfly in the family Platycnemididae. It is native to the southern half of Africa, where it is widespread from Angola to Mozambique. It lives in tropical rivers and streams.

References

Platycnemididae
Odonata of Africa
Insects described in 1902
Taxonomy articles created by Polbot